Yeniçevre is a village in the Genç District, Bingöl Province, Turkey. The village is populated by Kurds and had a population of 332 in 2021.

References 

Villages in Genç District
Kurdish settlements in Bingöl Province